The 1997–98 Eastern Michigan Eagles men's basketball team represented Eastern Michigan University during the 1997–98 NCAA Division I men's basketball season. The Eagles, led by head coach Milton Barnes, played their home games at Bowen Field House and were members of the Mid-American Conference. They finished the season 20–10, 13–5 in MAC play. They finished third in the MAC West regular season standings and won the MAC tournament to receive an automatic bid to the NCAA tournament as No. 13 seed in the East region. The Eagles were beaten by No. 4 seed Michigan State in the opening round in what was Tom Izzo's first NCAA Tournament win.

Roster

Source:

Schedule and results 

|-
!colspan=9 style=| Regular season

|-
!colspan=9 style=| MAC tournament

|-
!colspan=9 style=| NCAA tournament

NBA draft

References

Eastern Michigan Eagles men's basketball seasons
Eastern Michigan
Eastern Michigan
Eastern Michigan Eagles Men's Basketball
Eastern Michigan Eagles Men's Basketball